Austria competed at the 1936 Winter Olympics in Garmisch-Partenkirchen, Germany.

Medalists

Alpine skiing

Women

Bobsleigh

Cross-country skiing

Men

Men's 4 x 10 km relay

Figure skating

Men

Women

Pairs

Ice hockey

Group A
Top two teams advanced to semifinals

Group B
Top two teams advanced to Medal Round

Nordic combined 

Events:
 18 km cross-country skiing
 normal hill ski jumping

The cross-country skiing part of this event was combined with the main medal event of cross-country skiing. Those results can be found above in this article in the cross-country skiing section. Some athletes (but not all) entered in both the cross-country skiing and Nordic combined event, their time on the 18 km was used for both events.

The ski jumping (normal hill) event was held separate from the main medal event of ski jumping, results can be found in the table below.

Ski jumping

Speed skating

Men

References

 Olympic Winter Games 1936, full results by sports-reference.com

Nations at the 1936 Winter Olympics
1936
Olympics, Winter